Mauro G. Di Pasquale (born 1945) is a world champion powerlifter, bodybuilding author, columnist and low-carbohydrate diet advocate.

Biography

Di Pasquale was an assistant professor at the University of Toronto from 1988 to 1998. He lectured and researched on athletic performance, nutritional supplements and drug use in sports. He holds an honors degree in biological science, majoring in molecular biochemistry (1968), and a medical degree (1971) – both from the University of Toronto. Di Pasquale is certified as a Medical Review Officer (MRO) by the Medical Review Officer Certification Council (MROCC). He was the MRO for the National Association for Stock Car Auto Racing (NASCAR). From 1997 to 1999 Di Pasquale was involved in writing, research and product development for Experimental and Applied Sciences (EAS).

As a bodybuilding author, Di Pasquale has written thousands of articles for many large bodybuilding and fitness magazines such as Muscle & Fitness and Iron Man; His articles and books have been translated into Italian language and published in Italy by Sandro Ciccarelli Olympian's News magazine. He has also written several books on bodybuilding related topics such as bodybuilding nutrition and performance-enhancing drugs.  Impressed by the way Di Pasquale would monitor steroid use in the bodybuilding industry, World Wrestling Federation (WWF) owner Vince McMahon hired him in June 1992 to monitor the company's new drug testing program; at this time, McMahon was facing criminal charges for allegedly supplying steroids to some of his wrestlers in a manner that violated federal law and was hoping to regain public confidence. While working with the WWF, Di Pasquale took a hardline approach and ensured that anyone who failed a drug test would leave the company; such an example showed when WWF wrestler The Ultimate Warrior failed a drug test in September 1992. His firm policy towards steroid use earned him the nickname "Mr. Steroid Hunter."

Diet

Di Pasquale is an advocate of low-carbohydrate dieting. He has authored The Anabolic Diet (1995) which advocates a cyclic ketogenic diet (CKD). His diet was also called "The Pork Chop Diet".

Powerlifting

Di Pasquale is a multiple time national and world champion in the sport of powerlifting. Di Pasquale won the IPF World Powerlifting Championships in 1976, and the IPF World Games in 1981.

Di Pasquale was an eight-time Canadian champion, and two-time Pan American and North American champion. He was also the first Canadian powerlifter to become a World Champion and first Canadian powerlifter to total 10 times bodyweight in any weight class. Di Pasquale is the only Canadian to ever total ten times bodyweight in two weight classes.

Selected publications

Drug Use and Detection in Amateur Sports (1984)
The Anabolic Diet (1995)
Amino Acids and Proteins for the Athlete: The Anabolic Edge (1997)
The Metabolic Diet: The Revolutionary Diet that Explodes the Myths About Carbohydrates and Fats (2000)

References

1945 births
Living people
Canadian male non-fiction writers
Canadian powerlifters
Canadian strength athletes
Competitors at the 1981 World Games
Low-carbohydrate diet advocates
Male powerlifters
World Games gold medalists